Steven Craig Bondy is an American diplomat who has served as the United States Ambassador to Bahrain since February 2022.

Education 
Raised in Livingston, New Jersey, Bondy was a 1980 graduate of Livingston High School. He earned his Bachelor of Arts and Master of Arts degrees from the University of Delaware.

Career 
Bondy is a career member of the Senior Foreign Service, class of Minister-Counselor. From 2017 to 2020 he was Chargé d'affaires and Deputy Chief of Mission at the U.S. Embassy in Abu Dhabi, United Arab Emirates. He previously served as the Assistant Chief of Mission in Kabul, Afghanistan and as the foreign policy advisor to the commander of the Joint Special Operations Command. He is the recipient of numerous U.S. government awards, including a Presidential Rank Award.

Ambassador to Bahrain
On April 15, 2021, President Joe Biden nominated Bondy to be the next United States Ambassador to Bahrain. On October 5, 2021, a hearing on his nomination was held before the Senate Foreign Relations Committee. On October 19, 2021, his nomination was reported favorably out of committee. The United States Senate confirmed him on December 18, 2021 by voice vote, making him the second Jewish ambassador to Bahrain after J. Adam Ereli. Bondy presented his credentials to King Hamad bin Isa Al Khalifa on February 9, 2022.

Awards and recognitions
Bondy is the recipient of numerous U.S. government awards, including a Presidential Rank Award.

Personal life
Bondy is Jewish and speaks Arabic, French, Persian, Turkish and Spanish.

See also
List of ambassadors of the United States

References

Year of birth missing (living people)
Living people
21st-century American diplomats
21st-century American Jews
Place of birth missing (living people)
Livingston High School (New Jersey) alumni
People from Livingston, New Jersey
University of Delaware alumni
United States Foreign Service personnel
Ambassadors of the United States to Bahrain